Edgmont may refer to:

 Edgmont Township, Delaware County, Pennsylvania, USA
 Egmont (electoral district), Prince Edward Island, Canada; a federal riding

See also

 
 Edgmond, Telford and Wrekin, Shropshire, England, UK; a village
 Edgemont (disambiguation)
 Edge (disambiguation)
 EDG (disambiguation)